You Blew It! was an American emo quintet based in Orlando, Florida. The band was formed in 2009 by Tanner Jones, Timothy Flynn, and Matt Messore.

History
In 2012, the band released their debut LP, Grow Up, Dude under Topshelf Records. Prior to their LP, the band released two EPs: EP in 2009 and The Past in the Present in 2010.

Following Grow Up, Dude the band released a split EP in 2013 entitled Florida Doesn't Suck with fellow Floridian band Fake Problems. Their 2014 LP, Keep Doing What You're Doing, achieved the most commercial success of any of their albums, charting in the Billboard 200, the Billboard Top Heatseekers and the Independent Albums charts. Later that same year, the band released a cover EP, entitled You Blue It, which features covers from Weezer's 1994 album, The Blue Album. The most recent work by the band was a twelve-track LP entitled Abentrot which came out on November 11, 2016.

On October 9, 2017, the band announced their final two shows "for the foreseeable future." The band briefly reunited in August of 2018 to play three shows in Florida with the emo band American Football, stating that "passing on the opportunity to play with them would forever rest in the back of our minds," via their Instagram.  

The band was inactive from 2018 until early 2022. In September 2021, Tanner Jones formed a band called Couplet with members of Into It. Over It. & Sincere Engineer. The debut album, Lp1, was released on October 1, 2021. On April 25, 2022 the band released four previously unreleased demo tracks from the Grow Up, Dude sessions.

On July 22, 2022, while Anaya's band Pool Kids was supporting Jones' band Couplet, the duo performed an impromptu acoustic You Blew It! set.

On February 11, 2023, the band announced they would be reuniting with the original lineup to perform a one-off reunion show on May 12th performing the band's material from 2009-2012 at Nice Guy's Pizza. Two more shows were added due to overwhelming demand.

Members

Members 

 Timothy Flynn - drums (2009-2015, 2023)
 Tanner Jones - vocals/guitar (2009-2017, 2018, 2022, 2023)
 Mate Messore (2009-????, 2023)
 Trevor O'Hare - guitar/backing vocals
 Andrew Vila - bass (2015-2017, 2018)

Former Members 

 Andrew Anaya - guitar/backing vocals (????-2017, 2018, 2022)
 David Fuentes
 Nick Inmann - bass (????-2013)
 Mark Ispass
 Matthew Nissley - drums (2015-2017, 2018)
 Andrew Vila - bass (2015-2017, 2018)

Discography

Studio albums

Extended plays

References

External links 
 

Topshelf Records artists
Musical groups established in 2009
Musical groups from Orlando, Florida
Emo revival groups
Emo musical groups from Florida